Urva (also, Urvan) is a village and municipality in the Qusar Rayon of Azerbaijan.  It has a population of 2,472.  The municipality consists of the villages of Urva and Urvaoba. In 1908, Urva had 1,015 residents, all of them Lezgins.

References 

Populated places in Qusar District